Serbia participated in the Eurovision Song Contest 2021 with the song "" written by Nemanja Antonić, Sanja Vučić and Darko Dimitrov. The song was performed by the group Hurricane, which were internally selected by the Serbian national broadcaster, Radio Television of Serbia (RTS) to represent Serbia in the 2021 contest in Rotterdam, Netherlands. Among the members of the group included Sanja Vučić who had previously represented Serbia in the Eurovision Song Contest in 2016 where she placed eighteenth with the song "Goodbye (Shelter)". Hurricane was announced as the Serbian representative on 17 December 2020 after they were due to compete in the 2020 contest with "" before the event's cancellation, while the song, "", was presented on 5 March 2021.

Serbia was drawn to compete in the second semi-final of the Eurovision Song Contest which took place on 20 May 2021. Performing during the show in position 9, "" was announced among the top 10 entries of the second semi-final and therefore qualified to compete in the final on 22 May. It was later revealed that Serbia placed eighth out of the 17 participating countries in the semi-final with 124 points. In the final, Serbia performed in position 8 and placed fifteenth out of the 26 participating countries, scoring 102 points.

Background 

Prior to the 2021 contest, Serbia had participated in the Eurovision Song Contest as an independent nation twelve times since its first entry in 2007, winning the contest with their debut entry "" performed by Marija Šerifović. Since 2007, nine out of twelve of Serbia's entries have featured in the final with the nation failing to qualify in 2009, 2013 and 2017. Serbia's 2019 entry "" performed by Nevena Božović qualified to the final and placed eighteenth.

The Serbian national broadcaster, Radio Television of Serbia (RTS), broadcasts the event within Serbia and organises the selection process for the nation's entry. RTS confirmed their intentions to participate at the 2020 Eurovision Song Contest on 25 July 2019. Between 2007 and 2009, Serbia used the  national final in order to select their entry. However, after their 2009 entry, "" performed by Marko Kon and Milaan, failed to qualify Serbia to the final, the broadcaster shifted their selection strategy to selecting specific composers to create songs for artists. In 2010, RTS selected Goran Bregović to compose songs for a national final featuring three artists, while in 2011 Kornelije Kovač, Aleksandra Kovač and Kristina Kovač were tasked with composing one song each. In 2012, the internal selection of Željko Joksimović and the song "" secured the country's second highest placing in the contest to this point, placing third. In 2013, RTS returned to an open national final format and organized the  competition. The winning entry, "Ljubav je svuda" performed by Moje 3, failed to qualify Serbia to the final at the 2013 Eurovision Song Contest. In 2015, RTS selected Vladimir Graić, the composer of Serbia's 2007 Eurovision Song Contest winning entry "", to compose songs for a national final featuring three artists. RTS internally selected the Serbian entries in 2016 and 2017 with the decision made by RTS music editors. Since 2018, RTS returned to using the  national final in order to select their entry, managing to qualify every year to the final since.

Before Eurovision

Internal selection
The group Hurricane was confirmed by RTS on 17 December 2020 as the artist to represent Serbia at the Eurovision Song Contest 2021. Despite initial plans of organizing a national final, RTS ultimately internally selected the song Hurricane would perform at the Eurovision Song Contest and would be titled "", written by Nemanja Antonić, Darko Dimitrov and Hurricane member Sanja Vučić who represented Serbia in the Eurovision Song Contest 2016. "" was presented through the release of the official music video, directed by Dejan Milićević, via the official Eurovision Song Contest's YouTube channel on 5 March 2021.

At Eurovision 
According to Eurovision rules, all nations with the exceptions of the host country and the "Big Five" (France, Germany, Italy, Spain and the United Kingdom) are required to qualify from one of two semi-finals in order to compete for the final; the top ten countries from each semi-final progress to the final. The European Broadcasting Union (EBU) split up the competing countries into six different pots based on voting patterns from previous contests, with countries with favourable voting histories put into the same pot. The semi-final allocation draw held for the Eurovision Song Contest 2020 on 28 January 2020 was used for the 2021 contest, which Serbia was placed into the second semi-final, to be held on 20 May 2021, and was scheduled to perform in the first half of the show.

Once all the competing songs for the 2021 contest had been released, the running order for the semi-finals was decided by the shows' producers rather than through another draw, so that similar songs were not placed next to each other. Serbia was set to perform in position 9, following the entry from Iceland and before the entry from Georgia.

The final was also broadcast via radio on Radio Belgrade 1 with commentary by Nikoleta Dojčinović and Katarina Epštajn. The Serbian spokesperson, who announced the top 12-point score awarded by the Serbian jury during the final, was Dragana Kosjerina.

Semi-final 
Hurricane took part in technical rehearsals on 10 and 13 May, followed by dress rehearsals on 19 and 20 May. This included the jury show on 19 May where the professional juries of each country watched and voted on the competing entries.

The Serbian performance featured the members of Hurricane performing a dance routine both on the main stage and satellite stage. The stage lighting predominately displayed red, black and white colours with the background LED screens displaying the song title "" in black and white as well as separate light rectangles which each member of Hurricane stood on. The performance also featured pyrotechnic effects. The director of the Serbian performance was Miodrag Kolarić and the choreography was completed by Milan Gromilić. Hurricane were joined by three off-stage backing vocalists: Olga Popović, Jelena Pajić and Mladen Lukić. Lukić had previously represented Serbia in the Eurovision Song Contest 2018 as part of the group Balkanika. The black stage costumes for the performance were designed by designer Boris Kargotić.

At the end of the show, Serbia was announced as having finished in the top 10 and subsequently qualifying for the grand final. It was later revealed that Serbia placed eighth in the semi-final, receiving a total of 124 points: 68 points from the televoting and 56 points from the juries.

Final 
Shortly after the second semi-final, a winners' press conference was held for the ten qualifying countries. As part of this press conference, the qualifying artists took part in a draw to determine which half of the grand final they would subsequently participate in. This draw was done in the order the countries were announced during the semi-final. Serbia was drawn to compete in the second half. Following this draw, the shows' producers decided upon the running order of the final, as they had done for the semi-finals. Serbia was subsequently placed to perform in position 8, following the entry from Portugal and before the entry from United Kingdom.

Hurricane once again took part in dress rehearsals on 21 and 22 May before the final, including the jury final where the professional juries cast their final votes before the live show. Hurricane performed a repeat of their semi-final performance during the final on 22 May. Serbia placed fifteenth in the final, scoring 102 points: 82 points from the televoting and 20 points from the juries.

Voting 
Voting during the three shows involved each country awarding two sets of points from 1-8, 10 and 12: one from their professional jury and the other from televoting. Each nation's jury consisted of five music industry professionals who are citizens of the country they represent. This jury judged each entry based on: vocal capacity; the stage performance; the song's composition and originality; and the overall impression by the act. In addition, each member of a national jury may only take part in the panel once every three years, and no jury was permitted to discuss of their vote with other members or be related in any way to any of the competing acts in such a way that they cannot vote impartially and independently. The individual rankings of each jury member in an anonymised form as well as the nation's televoting results were released shortly after the grand final.

Below is a breakdown of points awarded to Serbia and awarded by Serbia in the second semi-final and grand final of the contest, and the breakdown of the jury voting and televoting conducted during the two shows:

Points awarded to Serbia

Points awarded by Serbia

Detailed voting results
The following members comprised the Serbian jury:
  (Extra Nena)
 Tijana Bogićević
 Slobodan Marković
 Ivana Peters
 Milan Stanković

References

External links
 

2021
Countries in the Eurovision Song Contest 2021
Eurovision